Robertson Barracks is a major Australian Army base located in the Northern Territory of Australia within the suburb of Holtze in the Municipality of Litchfield about  east of the Darwin city centre. The barracks were built during the 1990s. The Barracks are home to the 1st Brigade and the 1st Aviation Regiment. Robertson Barracks has a helicopter airfield, similar to Holsworthy Barracks. The barracks was named after Lieutenant General Sir Horace Robertson, commander of the 1st Armoured Division and 6th Division during the Second World War, and later Commander in Chief British Commonwealth Occupation Force in Japan.

Units
The units currently located on Robertson Barracks are:

1 Brigade units
1st Armoured Regiment
1st Combat Service Support Battalion
1st Combat Signals Regiment
1st Combat Engineer Regiment
5th Battalion, Royal Australian Regiment
8th/12th Regiment, Royal Australian Artillery

External units

1st Aviation Regiment
B Coy, 1st Military Police Battalion
Joint Movements Control Office – Darwin
Joint Logistics Unit (North)
 1st Close Health Battalion (Headquarters)
 8th Close Health Company

The "Atomic Tank" was a Centurion which was placed 500m from ground zero of a 10Kt atomic bomb test at Woomera in 1953; it was damaged but still driveable, was repaired and served in Vietnam, before being used as a "gate guardian" at Robertson Barracks.

US Marines

In 2011 as part of the Obama administration's "pivot to Asia" it was announced that US Marines would be based in Darwin at the Robertson Barracks. In November 2011 it was announced that up to 2,500 US Marines would be based in Australia for training, starting from 200 to 250 in 2012, to 2500 over the following five years. The Marine groups were to stay for six months at a time.

Robertson Barracks is reported to be a future site of a United States Pacific Command, Marine Rotational Force-Darwin (MRF-D), and its current capacity of 4,500 troops will be upgraded in the near future. Currently, the size and the accessibility of key facilities in Darwin follows closely with other US deployment sites around the globe.

In 2016, 1,250 US Marines deployed to Robertson Barracks, along with four UH-1Y Venom helicopters.

Drawn out negotiations over cost-sharing and other issues mean that the original number of 2,500 Marines per deployment will not be reached until at least 2020.

Notes

References

External links
ADF official site.

Buildings and structures in Darwin, Northern Territory
Barracks in Australia
Military installations in the Northern Territory
Australian Army aviation
Military installations of the United States in Australia